Knockdown or knock-down may refer to:

 Knockdown, a situation in full-contact combat sports where a fighter is down or vulnerable, often preliminary to a knockout
"Knockdown" (Castle), the thirteenth episode of the third season of the TV series Castle
 knock-down fastener
 knock-down furniture
 Knockdown (arcade game)', an arcade game released by Namco
 Knockdown (G.I. Joe), a fictional character in the G.I. Joe universe
 "Knockdown" (song), a song by Alesha Dixon
 KnocDown, a music producer
 Knockdown, a nautical term for a near-capsize
 Knock-down kit, a complete kit needed to assemble a vehicle
 Knockdown resistance, genetic resistance to pyrethroid insecticides in many insect species
 Knockdown texture, a drywall finishing style
 Gene knockdown, a genetic modification technique